A list of all senior medalists at the USA Gymnastics National Championships.

Senior Women's Medalists

All-Around

Vault

Uneven Bars

Balance Beam

Floor Exercise

Junior Women's Medalists

All-Around

References 

USA Gymnastics